Major is an unincorporated community located in Owsley County, Kentucky, United States. Its post office is open.

References

Unincorporated communities in Owsley County, Kentucky
Unincorporated communities in Kentucky